John Middleton (born 11 July 1955) is an English former footballer who played for Bradford City and Macclesfield Town. He was born in Rawmarsh, near Rotherham.

References

1955 births
Living people
People from Rawmarsh
Footballers from South Yorkshire
English footballers
Bradford City A.F.C. players
Macclesfield Town F.C. players
Association football defenders